Most parks in Milwaukee are owned and maintained by Milwaukee County as part of a county-wide system. However, some parks are administered by other entities, such as the state of Wisconsin, the city of Milwaukee, or neighborhood organizations.

Parks in Milwaukee County park system
The Milwaukee County Park system was awarded the 2009 National Gold Medal Award "for excellence in the field of park and recreation management" by the National Recreation and Park Association.

Other parks

See also
 Milwaukee
 Neighborhoods of Milwaukee
 Oak Leaf Trail
 List of baseball parks in Milwaukee

References

External links

 Milwaukee County Parks
 Park People: Friends of the Milwaukee County Parks

County parks in Wisconsin
Protected areas of Milwaukee County, Wisconsin
Parks in Wisconsin
Urban public parks
Geography of Milwaukee
Tourist attractions in Milwaukee
Articles containing video clips
Parks in Milwaukee, Wisconsin
Milwaukee